Wayne Ferreira defeated Lleyton Hewitt in the final, 7–6(8–6), 3–6, 6–7(5–7), 7–6 (7–2), 6–2 to win the singles tennis title at the 2000 Eurocard Open.

Thomas Enqvist was the defending champion, but lost to Ferreira in the second round.

Seeds
A champion seed is indicated in bold text while text in italics indicates the round in which that seed was eliminated. All sixteen seeds received a bye into the second round.

  Marat Safin (third round)
  Gustavo Kuerten (third round)
  Magnus Norman (third round)
  Andre Agassi (third round)
  Thomas Enqvist (second round)
  Yevgeny Kafelnikov (semifinals)
  Álex Corretja (second round)
  Lleyton Hewitt (final)
  Tim Henman (third round)
  Juan Carlos Ferrero (second round)
  Franco Squillari (third round)
  Mark Philippoussis (third round)
  Nicolas Kiefer (withdrew)
  Patrick Rafter (second round)
  Nicolás Lapentti (second round)
  Mariano Puerta (second round)

Draw

Finals

Top half

Section 1

Section 2

Bottom half

Section 3

Section 4

External links 
 2000 Stuttgart Masters draw

Singles